Lars Matton (25 December 1924 – 16 September 2004) was a Swedish sailor. He competed in the Swallow event at the 1948 Summer Olympics.

References

External links
 

1924 births
2004 deaths
Swedish male sailors (sport)
Olympic sailors of Sweden
Sailors at the 1948 Summer Olympics – Swallow
Sportspeople from Stockholm